Sun Rui is the name of:

Sun Rui (footballer, born 1978), Chinese female association footballer
Sun Rui (footballer, born 1999), Chinese male association footballer
Sun Rui (ice hockey) (born 1982), Chinese female ice hockey player
Sun Rui (dancer) (born 1984), Chinese male dancer
Sun Rui (singer) (born 1995), Chinese female singer and actress